Ocalenie ("Rescue") is a poetry collection by Czesław Miłosz. It was first published in 1945. Many of the poems collected were written in Warsaw during the Nazi occupation.

Partial contents 
 "World: Naïve Poems"—a sequence of pastoral poems
 "By the Peonies"
 "Song on the End of the World"
 "Campo dei Fiori"—"a civic-minded poem about people’s indifference to the deaths of others"
 "The Voices of Poor People"—cycle
 "A Poor Christian Looks at the Ghetto"
 "Dedication"

References 

1945 poetry books
Polish poetry collections
Poetry by Czesław Miłosz